LaVon in a given name. Notable people with the name include:

 LaVon Brazill (born 1989), American football player
 LaVon Crosby (1924–2016), American politician
 Lavon Heidemann (born 1958), American politician 
 LaVon Mercer (born 1959), American-Israeli basketball player
 Lavon Volski (born 1965),  Belarusian musician and writer

See also
Levon (name), given name and surname